Booth is a hamlet near Goole, in the East Riding of Yorkshire, England.   Booth is also known as Boothferry or Boothferry Bridge.

References

Hamlets in the East Riding of Yorkshire